Jar Khoshk-e Sofla (also Romanized as Jar Khoshk-e Soflá; also known as Jar Khoshk-e Pā’īn) is a village in Pain Velayat Rural District, Razaviyeh District, Mashhad County, Razavi Khorasan Province, Iran. At the 2006 census, its population was 296, in 72 families.

References 

Populated places in Mashhad County